Minden Heights is a residential neighbourhood within the city of George Town in Penang, Malaysia.

Etymology 

Minden Heights was named after the Minden Barracks, which was established in the area by the British Army in 1939. The barracks has since been subsumed as part of Universiti Sains Malaysia.

History 
Minden Heights was first developed as a housing estate by Dr Che Lah, an ethnic Malay councillor of the Penang Island Municipal Council (now Penang Island City Council). The neighbourhood, which borders Universiti Sains Malaysia's main campus, was completed in 1975, four years prior to the opening of the university's medical school.

Transportation 
Rapid Penang bus routes 102, 301, 303, 304 and 401 include stops along Jalan Sultan Azlan Shah, which marks the eastern limits of Minden Heights.

Education 

Universiti Sains Malaysia (USM), Penang's premier public university, is situated immediately south of Minden Heights. One of the top Malaysian public universities, USM was ranked fifth within Malaysia by the QS World University Rankings .

In addition, two primary schools are situated within Minden Heights.
 SK Minden Height
 SRK Sungai Gelugor

See also 
 Taman Tun Sardon
 Gelugor

References 

Neighbourhoods in George Town, Penang